Pulopanja is a village in the Nicobar district of Andaman and Nicobar Islands, India. It is on the Little Nicobar Island and is administered as part of the Great Nicobar tehsil. The village suffered severe damage during the 2004 Indian Ocean earthquake and tsunami.

Demographics 

According to the 2011 census of India, Pulopanja has 16 households. The effective literacy rate (i.e. the literacy rate excluding children aged 6 and below) is 42.37%.

References 

Villages in Great Nicobar tehsil